Vasquez v. Hillery, 474 U.S. 254 (1986), is a United States Supreme Court case, which held that a defendant's conviction must be reversed if members of their race were systematically excluded from the grand jury that indicted them, even if they were convicted following an otherwise fair trial.

Background
An African-American man named Booker T. Hillery was indicted for murder by a California grand jury in 1962. Hillery was accused of stabbing a fifteen-year-old white girl named Marlene Miller with scissors in the small town of Hanford. Miller was said to be sewing a dress alone in the house and did not notice an intruder sneaking into the house. The perpetrator fought with the young woman, hogtied her and stabbed her in the  chest.

Historical context
The original conviction of Hillery occurred in the early 1960s in California. At that time, America was in the middle of the Civil Rights Movement. Blacks were excluded from the indicting grand jury, which led Hillery to claim that he was denied equal protection rights guaranteed by the Fourteenth Amendment. He petitioned for a retrial on that basis.

Legal challenge
In 1978, Hillery filed a petition for a writ of habeas corpus in federal court, which granted the writ, citing grand jury discrimination. The Court of Appeals affirmed this ruling. In 1986, his original conviction was overturned by the U.S. Supreme Court. Hillery was retried later that year, and was again convicted in the second trial. The forensic evidence which helped convict Hillery in the second trial was examined in the 2003 episode of Forensic Files titled "Paintball".

Opinion of the Court

Majority
Justice Marshall delivered the opinion of the Court, stating:
 

Marshall then went on to say:

Concurrence
Justice O'Connor concurred in the judgment. O'Connor stated:

Dissent
Justice Powell, joined by Chief Justice Burger and Justice Rehnquist, dissented, arguing that "the Court misapplies stare decisis because it relies only on decisions concerning grand jury discrimination. There is other precedent, including important cases of more recent vintage than those cited by the Court, that should control this case. Those cases hold, or clearly imply, that a conviction should not be reversed for constitutional error where the error did not affect the outcome of the prosecution".

Powell continues his dissent by mentioning that since Chapman v. California, "the Court has consistently made clear that it is the duty of a reviewing court to consider the trial record as a whole and to ignore errors that are harmless, including most constitutional violations." After citing cases where the Supreme Court applied harmless-error analysis or an analogous prejudice requirement on this basis, Powell stated:

Finally, Powell believes that the Appellate Court's decision, overturning Hillery's conviction should be reversed because the "respondent's grand jury discrimination claim casts no doubt on the adequacy of the procedures used to convict him or on the sufficiency of the evidence of his guilt".

References

External links
 

1986 in United States case law
United States equal protection case law
United States Supreme Court cases
United States Supreme Court cases of the Burger Court
United States Fourth Amendment case law
United States equal protection and criminal procedure case law
Hanford, California
History of Kings County, California
United States racial discrimination case law